Jang In-won (born 1936) is a South Korean speed skater. He competed in three events at the 1960 Winter Olympics.

References

1936 births
Living people
South Korean male speed skaters
Olympic speed skaters of South Korea
Speed skaters at the 1960 Winter Olympics
Place of birth missing (living people)